{{Speciesbox
| image = 
| image_caption = 
| taxon = Cosmopterix holophracta| authority = Meyrick, 1909
| synonyms = *Cosmopteryx holophracta}}Cosmopterix holophracta'' is a moth in the family Cosmopterigidae. It was described by Edward Meyrick in 1909. It is found in India.

References

Moths described in 1909
holophracta